In enzymology, a nicotinate-nucleotide diphosphorylase (carboxylating) is an enzyme that catalyzes the chemical reaction

nicotinate D-ribonucleotide + diphosphate + CO2  pyridine-2,3-dicarboxylate + 5-phospho-alpha-D-ribose 1-diphosphate

The 3 substrates of this enzyme are nicotinate D-ribonucleotide, diphosphate, and CO2, whereas its two products are pyridine-2,3-dicarboxylate and 5-phospho-alpha-D-ribose 1-diphosphate.

This enzyme belongs to the family of glycosyltransferases, specifically the pentosyltransferases.  The systematic name of this enzyme class is nicotinate-nucleotide:diphosphate phospho-alpha-D-ribosyltransferase (carboxylating). Other names in common use include quinolinate phosphoribosyltransferase (decarboxylating), quinolinic acid phosphoribosyltransferase, QAPRTase, NAD+ pyrophosphorylase, nicotinate mononucleotide pyrophosphorylase (carboxylating), and quinolinic phosphoribosyltransferase.  This enzyme participates in nicotinate and nicotinamide metabolism.

Structural studies

References

 
 

EC 2.4.2
Enzymes of known structure